Lai Yawen (born 9 September 1970 in Dalian) is a Chinese former volleyball player and the current assistant coach of China's women's national volleyball team. She competed in the 1992 Summer Olympics and in the 1996 Summer Olympics.

References

1973 births
Living people
Chinese women's volleyball players
Olympic volleyball players of China
Volleyball players at the 1992 Summer Olympics
Volleyball players at the 1996 Summer Olympics
Olympic silver medalists for China
Olympic medalists in volleyball
Asian Games medalists in volleyball
Volleyball players at the 1990 Asian Games
Volleyball players at the 1994 Asian Games
Volleyball players at the 1998 Asian Games
Medalists at the 1996 Summer Olympics
Volleyball players from Dalian
Medalists at the 1990 Asian Games
Medalists at the 1994 Asian Games
Medalists at the 1998 Asian Games
Asian Games gold medalists for China
Asian Games silver medalists for China
20th-century Chinese women